Solanum retroflexum, commonly known as umsobo (isiZulu), wonderberry or sunberry, is a historic heirloom fruiting shrub. Both common names are also used for the European black nightshade (Solanum nigrum) in some places, particularly where the latter species has been introduced, so care must be taken to distinguish them. It is sometimes called garden huckleberry, but that properly refers to the S. scabrum described by Philip Miller.

Its old scientific name that is still often seen, Solanum × burbankii, indicates a plant of hybrid origin. It was supposedly bred by Luther Burbank in the early 1900s as a hybrid of S. villosum and S. guineense but in fact S. retroflexum is a proper species of its own, while the supposed hybrid combination would not be viable due to different ploidy of S. guineense and S. villosum.

The plant produces diminutive, dark blue-purple edible fruits that are bland in flavor and often combined with sugar in desserts. Green (unripe) fruits may be poisonous.

The wonderberry shrub is an extremely easy-to-grow plant which is grown similarly to tomatoes. Seeds are sown in the summer in full or part sun. Fruit can be expected in 75 days.

References

retroflexum
Edible Solanaceae
Berries